Paolo Malanima (born 17 December 1950) is an Italian economic historian and director of the Institute of Studies on Mediterranean Societies in Naples. Malanima's main research interests are long-term developments in economic history, particularly the performance of the Italian economy since Classical antiquity, history of energy and global history.

Life 
Paolo Malanima received his education in Humanities at the Scuola Normale Superiore in Pisa and the University of Pisa from 1969 to 1973. He was Professor of Economic History and Economics at the University of Pisa from 1977 until 1994, and at the Magna Græcia University in Catanzaro, Calabria, from 1994 until 2002. 

Since 2002, Malanima is director of the Institute of Studies on Mediterranean Societies (ISSM) in Naples, which is part of the Italian National Council of Research.

Malanima is president of the European School for Training in Economic and Social Historical Research (ESTER) at the University of Groningen since 2000, member of the executive committee of the programme of Ramses 2 coordinated by the Maison de la Méditerranée in Aix-en-Provence, and member of the scientific committee and council of the "Istituto Internazionale di Storia Economica F. Datini" (both since 2009). 

As of 2010, Malanima is on the editorial board of the journals Società e Storia and Rivista di Storia Economica, corresponding editor of the International Review of Social History (since 1993), and member of the council of Investigaciones de Historia Economica. In the years 2003 to 2009, he was member of the board of the Italian Society of Historical Demography (SIDES). Since 2005, he is also the editor of the Rapporto sulle economie del Mediterraneo, an annual periodical published by Il Mulino.

Recent works 
 L'economia italiana. Dalla crescita medievale alla crescita contemporanea, Bologna: Il Mulino, 2002
 Progress, Decline, Growth: Product and Productivity in Italian Agriculture, 1000–2000, Economic History Review, Vol. 57, No. 3, 2004, pp. 437–464 (co-author)
 Cycles and Stability. Italian Population before the Demographic Transition (225 B.C. – A.D. 1900), Rivista di Storia Economica, Vol. 21, No. 3, 2005, pp. 197–232 (co-author), ISSN 
 Urbanisation and the Italian Economy During the Last Millennium, European Review of Economic History, Vol. 9, 2005, pp. 97–122
 Energy Consumption in Italy in the 19th and 20th Centuries, Napoli: Issm-Cnr, 2006
 Pre-modern European Economy. One Thousand Years (10th–19th Centuries), Leiden-Boston: Brill 2009
 GDP in Pre-Modern Agrarian Economies (1–1820 AD). A Revision of the Estimates, Rivista di Storia Economica, Vol. 25, No. 3, 2009, pp. 391–419 (co-author)
 150 Years of the Italian Economy, 1861–2010, Journal of Modern Italian Studies, Vol. 15, 2010, pp. 1–20 (co-author)
 Urbanisation 1700–1870, in Broadberry, S.; O'Rourke, K. (eds.), The Cambridge Economic History of Modern Europe, I, Chap. 10, Cambridge: Cambridge University Press, 2010

See also 
 Elio Lo Cascio

References

External links 
 Personal website

                   

20th-century Italian historians
Economic historians
Academic staff of the University of Pisa
University of Pisa alumni
1950 births
Living people
National Research Council (Italy) people
21st-century Italian historians